Venlaw Castle, also known as Smithfield Castle, lies north of Peebles on the Edinburgh Road in the Borders of Scotland. Since 1949, it has been operated as a hotel. It was designated in 1971 as a Category A listed building.

History

Venlaw Castle 
The site was formerly occupied by a 14th-century fortification founded by the Hay family, known as Smithfield Castle, which was destroyed in the 18th century. The present house was built for Alexander Stevenson, Sheriff Deputy of Peebleshire, on the site in 1782. It remained in the Stevenson family until it was bought by the Grant family in 1790 and then by the Erskine family in 1798. It became the home of Admiral of the Fleet Sir James Elphinstone Erskine in 1862. It then passed to Richard Davidson, a retired tea planter, and then to a Miss Walton in 1946.

Venlaw Castle Hotel
In 1948, new owners Alexander Cumming and his wife, Jean Brownlee, intended to convert the property to a hotel but were unable to pay "development tax", levied on people turning a private house into a business. Cumming successfully fought to have the tax abolished, and his success is recorded in Hansard. Venlaw Castle Hotel opened in 1949 and remained in the family until November 1997, when it was bought by John and Shirley Sloggie and renamed Castle Venlaw Hotel. The hotel was bought by PAG Hotels Ltd in September 2007 but PAG Hotels Ltd went into administration in July 2010. The Hotel was bought by a private couple in November 2011.

See also 
 Castles in Scotland
 Clan Tweedie
List of places in the Scottish Borders
List of places in Scotland

References

External links
GEOGRAPH image of Venlaw Castle
Scottish Borders Council leaflet: Walks around Peebles
Scottish Community Foundation: Venlaw Community Woodland, tree surgery work

Castles in the Scottish Borders
Category B listed buildings in the Scottish Borders
Listed houses in Scotland
History of the Scottish Borders